Mount Lindley is a mountain,  high, standing on the west side of Starshot Glacier,  north of Mount Hoskins in Antarctica. It was discovered by the British National Antarctic Expedition (1901–04) and named for Lord Lindley, a member of the committee that made the final draft of instructions for the expedition.

References

Mountains of Oates Land